Robert Caggiano (born November 7, 1976) is an American guitarist and record producer. Since 2013, Caggiano has been the lead guitarist of the rock band Volbeat. He had formerly been guitarist of thrash metal band Anthrax and nu metal band Boiler Room.

Career
Caggiano's first professional band was Boiler Room that formed in 1996. The band caught the attention of Roadrunner Records after an opening slot for the band Orgy in 1999. After several delays, the band eventually got Tommy Boy Records to release their debut album Can't Breathe. Soon after the release, the band broke up in summer 2000.  

He initially played with Anthrax from 2001 until 2005, exiting when their Among the Living lineup reunited, and later returning in 2007 following the end of that reunion. He appears on the albums We've Come for You All and Worship Music, as well as the Greater of Two Evils compilation (a live-in-the-studio recording of older material) and the live album Music of Mass Destruction. Caggiano was also part of "The Big 4" tour during 2010 and 2011 which featured Anthrax, Megadeth, Slayer, and Metallica. The Bulgaria show was streamed and broadcast to movie theaters all over the world and the entire "Big 4" show (Anthrax, Megadeth, Slayer and Metallica) came out on DVD in November 2010. 

Caggiano is also known as a record producer/mixer under the alias of Scrap 60 Productions most notably for producing Cradle of Filth, Anthrax, and Jesse Malin along with many other prominent metal/hard rock bands. Caggiano was also the guitarist/songwriter for a band called the Damned Things along with Scott Ian (Anthrax), Joe Trohman and Andy Hurley (Fall Out Boy), and Keith Buckley (Every Time I Die). The debut album for the Damned Things which was also produced and recorded by Caggiano was released through Island Records on December 13, 2010.

On January 4, 2013, it was announced that he had left Anthrax, reportedly in order to focus on studio production work for a while until he figured his next move as an artist. He said of his decision to leave "This is an extremely difficult and emotional decision for me to make but my heart is just steering me in a different direction right now. I've always been one to follow my heart in everything that I do and while this might be one of the hardest decisions I have ever had to make, it feels like the right one for me at this time."

On February 4, 2013, it was announced that Caggiano had officially joined Danish band Volbeat as lead guitarist. Originally called on as the record producer for Volbeat's new album Outlaw Gentlemen and Shady Ladies, Caggiano was asked to join as a full-time member two weeks into the recording process due to the chemistry between him and the other band members. In addition, Caggiano has also worked with singer Dani Filth, bass player King ov Hell as well as drummer John Tempesta in a new band, Temple of the Black Moon.

2015 saw the retrospective release of "Soda Pop" EP featuring three Caggiano guitar tracks from 1995.

Discography
with Anthrax

with Boiler Room

with The Damned Things

with Volbeat

Production discography (selection)

Cradle of Filth – Nymphetamine (Grammy nominated)
Cradle of Filth – Thornography
Sahg – "Sahg 2"
Bleeding Through – The Truth
Jesse Malin – "Glitter in the Gutter" (featuring Bruce Springsteen and Ryan Adams)
Ill Niño – One Nation Underground
Ill Niño – Revolution Revolución
Machine Head – "Supercharger Remix"
Anthrax – We've Come for You All
Anthrax – "The Greater of two Evils"
Prong – "Remix 2010"
H2O – "H2O"
The Agony Scene – The Darkest Red
A Life Once Lost – Hunter
Dry Kill Logic – The Darker Side of Nonsense
36 Crazyfists – Bitterness the Star
Straight Line Stitch – When Skies Wash Ashore
Chthonic – Mirror of Retribution
Muzzy – "Boathouse Sessions"
The Drama Club – "The Drama Club" EP 2008
Anthrax – Worship Music
Volbeat – Outlaw Gentlemen & Shady Ladies
Twelve Gauge Valentine – Shock Value

References

External links
Metal Antix interview
'Ironiclast' Cover Artwork Unveiled

American heavy metal guitarists
Living people
1976 births
Lead guitarists
Anthrax (American band) members
American expatriates in Denmark
The Damned Things members
Volbeat members
American people of Italian descent